John Thomas Ahlquist III (born January 25, 1968) is an American businessman, commercial real-estate developer, and retired physician from Idaho. He is the CEO of the development firm, Ball Ventures Ahlquist (BVA) and founder and Medical Director of MN Solutions. Prior to that, he was the COO of the Gardner Company where he helped develop projects like the Eighth & Main building and City Center Plaza in downtown Boise. He was a candidate for the Republican Party nomination for Governor of Idaho in the 2018 Idaho gubernatorial election.

Early life and education

Ahlquist was born on January 25, 1968, in Hunter, Utah, (now West Valley City, Utah) and grew up on a small family farm. Both of Ahlquist’s grandfathers worked for Kennecott Copper. His father, Tom, worked as a journeyman electrician when he was young and later as a construction manager for large commercial projects. His mother, Sandra, has owned her own preschool for nearly forty years. At the age of thirteen, Ahlquist earned his Eagle Scout Award, and then drew national attention by becoming one of only a few Scouts in the history of the Boy Scouts of America program to earn all 121 merit badges. Ahlquist was honored with a commendation from then-Utah Governor, Scott M. Matheson.

Ahlquist attended Cyprus High School in Magna, Utah where he participated in athletics and student government. He earned several awards for academic excellence and leadership and graduated in 1986. After high school, Ahlquist moved to Rexburg, Idaho to attend Ricks College (now Brigham Young University–Idaho) where he played basketball and studied pre-med.

After a year at Ricks College, he left to serve as an LDS missionary in Brazil. Upon his return in 1989, he enrolled in the University of Utah, where he managed the Pediatric Intensive Care Research Laboratory at the university while attending school. He graduated from the University of Utah with a BA degree in biology and a minor in chemistry in 1992. Ahlquist continued to study medicine at the University of Utah, graduating as a Doctor of Medicine in 1996.

Medical career

Ahlquist completed an emergency medicine residency at the University of Arizona in 1999. While there, he served as the chief resident and earned the award for Resident of the Year. He is board certified by the American Board of Emergency Medicine. After residency, Ahlquist began working as an attending physician in Boise, Idaho for St. Luke's Health System and has worked in emergency rooms across the state of Idaho for over 15 years. He was the head of the Emergency Department at St. Luke's Meridian Medical Center in Meridian, Idaho and worked the night shift there for six years. Ahlquist retired from full-time work as an emergency room physician in 2014.

In 2001, Ahlquist co-founded a public access defibrillator service company called Stat Pads. The company sells defibrillators and offers training to medical personnel. In his role as a developer, Ahlquist has also helped build numerous health care-related facilities in and around Boise, including The Portico and Unity Health Center in Meridian and several ongoing projects with the Saltzer Health, a Nampa-based health system. Ahlquist acquired Saltzer Health through his Ball Ventures Ahlquist (BVA) development company in January 2019.

Ahlquist Sold Saltzer health to IHC on October 1, 2020.

In 2019 started PIVOT Health, a primary care clinic targeting wellness and healthy lifestyle changes.

In response to pandemic, Ahlquist founded CTCI to assist Idahoans with COVID Testing and vaccinations. Ahlquist founded MN in 2020.

Developer career

In 2006, Ahlquist founded Ahlquist Development and began developing commercial real estate. After developing several smaller buildings, Ahlquist Development partnered with Gardner Company. Their first major joint development was The Portico at Meridian, a 7-building, 328,000 square-foot, mixed-use project in Meridian, Idaho. In 2005 and 2006, Ahlquist convinced 18 residents to sell their properties on the land that would become The Portico. Multiple joint venture projects followed in the Treasure Valley area including St. Luke's Medical Plaza in Nampa and Eagle Island Crossing in Eagle.

In 2010, Ahlquist Development merged with Gardner Company and the new entity retained the Gardner Company name. Ahlquist became COO of the company at the time of the merger. One of the most prominent projects Ahlquist worked on as COO of the Gardner Company was the property on Eighth & Main in Boise. Known colloquially as the "Boise Hole" because it had sat vacant for 25 years, the property was purchased by the Gardner Company in July 2011. The 18-story Eighth & Main office tower (also known as the Zions Bank building after its primary tenant) broke ground in 2012 and was completed in 2014, becoming the tallest building in Idaho.

In 2013, the Gardner Company purchased the U.S. Bank building, Idaho's second-tallest building. On the property around the tower, Ahlquist and the company helped develop the 400,000 square-foot City Center Plaza. The facility was completed in 2016 and included an underground transit center, new retail, an expanded convention center, Boise State University Computer Science Department, and the corporate headquarters for Clearwater Analytics. As COO of the Gardner Company, Ahlquist has led the development of numerous other properties in the Treasure Valley area, including the West Valley Medical Complex in Caldwell, Library Square in Nampa, Mace River Ranch in Eagle, and the ongoing Pioneer Crossing development in Downtown Boise.

In 2016, Ahlquist led the formation of a new division of Gardner Company in collaboration with the Brighton Corporation focusing on a continuum of care for seniors through independent living, assisted living, and skilled nursing facilities all tied into local health systems called Veranda Senior Living. Veranda currently has two locations in Meridian and Boise.

In June 2018, Ahlquist left his post as COO of the Gardner Company to head a new joint venture with Ball Ventures called Ball Ventures Ahlquist LLC (BVA). In September of that year, Ahlquist announced plans for a 90,000 square-foot medical office complex in Meridian called Central Valley Plaza. The development will also feature retail space. In addition to Central Valley Plaza, BVA was working on Ten Mile Crossing in Meridian and Pioneer Crossing, both of which were bought by BVA from Gardner. In January 2019, Ahlquist led BVA's acquisition of the Saltzer Medical Group, a Nampa-based health system. BVA changed the group's name to Saltzer Health shortly thereafter. BVA is planning to include Saltzer Health locations in its Ten Mile Crossing, Central Valley Plaza, and other developments. Other projects that Ahlquist is working on as CEO of BVA include Eagle View Landing in Meridian and an as yet unnamed development off of Interstate 84 in Caldwell. 

New BVA Projects include: Eagle View Landing, TopGolf, 4th and Idaho, North Ranch, 8th and Main, Pioneer Crossing, Ten Mile.

Political career

Ahlquist was a finalist for the Idaho State Department of Education Board opening in July 2014 when Milford Terrell announced that he was stepping down early from his term. David Hill, formerly with Idaho National Laboratory, received the appointment. He was a founder of Idaho 2020, a bipartisan think tank aimed at bringing together business leaders from around Idaho to focus on challenges facing the state. In 2015, the group studied the state's level of investment in infrastructure and developed suggestions for leaders and lawmakers. In January 2016, Ahlquist delivered a speech detailing the data collected at the Idaho Chamber Alliance and also presented the information to the Idaho state legislature.

2016 presidential election

Ahlquist supported Marco Rubio in the 2016 Republican Party presidential primaries and served as his financial co-chair for Idaho. He did not support eventual President Donald Trump in the general election and wrote in Marco Rubio. However, Ahlquist noted later that he supported and agreed with Trump as President.

2018 Idaho gubernatorial race

On March 1, 2017, Ahlquist announced his candidacy for the 2018 Idaho gubernatorial election in an event at the Zions Bank tower he helped develop. He also announced that he would be embarking on a 97-city campaign tour of the state, which he started later that week and finished in May 2017. His three main platforms were fixing Idaho's health care gap, economic development, and education. On September 5, 2017, he added a plank that called for ethics reform and term limits for various offices in the state. Throughout the race, Ahlquist was considered one of three Republican front-runners alongside Idaho Lieutenant Governor Brad Little and U.S. Representative Raúl Labrador. In October 2017, he received an official endorsement from Mitt Romney. He later received endorsements from conservative commentators, Charlie Kirk and Candace Owens. On May 15, 2018, Ahlquist earned 26.2% of the vote in the Idaho Republican Party primary election, falling behind Raúl Labrador (32.6%) and the eventual governor Brad Little (37.3%).

Community service
Ahlquist has served on multiple community boards and subcommittees, including Family Advocates, United Way of the Treasure Valley, YMCA, Boys & Girls Club, Boy Scouts of America Ore-Ida Council Board, Treasure Valley Leadership Alliance, Boise Valley Economic Partnership, Idaho Technology Council, Boise Metro Chamber of Commerce, Idaho State University President’s Advisory Board, University of Arizona Emergency Medicine Research Center Advisory Board, American Heart Association, March of Dimes, Go Red for Women, and the FACES of Hope Victims Center.

Ahlquist has been involved with community, Inspire Excellence, T2T, 300 Homes, Board of directors for Idaho Youth Ranch.

Personal life
Ahlquist is married to Shanna Mullins, his high-school sweetheart. They have four children. He is a member of the Church of Jesus Christ of Latter-day Saints, and served as a stake president in the Meridian Idaho North Stake of the LDS Church from October 27, 2013 to February 4, 2017.

References

External links
Ball Ventures Ahlquist official website

Idaho Republicans
1968 births
Brigham Young University–Idaho alumni
Latter Day Saints from Idaho
American emergency physicians
Living people
People from West Valley City, Utah
University of Utah alumni
American healthcare managers